Karimganj district is one of the 34 districts of the Indian state of Assam. Karimganj town is both the administrative headquarters district and the biggest town of this district. It is located in southern Assam and borders Tripura and the Sylhet Division of Bangladesh. It makes up the Barak Valley alongside Hailakandi and Cachar. Karimganj was previously part of the Sylhet District before the Partition of India. It became a district in 1983.

History
After the Conquest of Gour in 1303, many disciples of Shah Jalal migrated and settled in present-day Karimganj district where they preached Islam to the local people. Syed Abu Bakr migrated to Chhotalekha, Adam Khaki and Shah Syed Badruddin to Badarpur and Shah Sikandar to Bundasil (Deorail).

During the 15th century, an independent state was established in the region by a landowner named Malik Pratap, who seceded it from its previous rulers, the Manikya dynasty of Tripura. This state, named the Pratapgarh Kingdom, ruled there for several centuries and came into conflict with the neighbouring monarchs of Bengal and Kachar. Pratapgarh was eventually conquered by the latter during the early 17th century.

Karimganj was first established as a subdivision of the Sylhet district with 40 parganas in 1778. The area got its name from Muhammad Karim Chowdhury, a Bengali Muslim mirashdar who originally established a bazaar (known as Karimganj) less than four miles south of the confluence of the Natikhal and Kushiyara River. However, the Natikhal would become dry in autumn and for this reason, the bazaar was relocated to its present headquarters, Karimganj, in the 1870s.   

During the partition of India 1946–47, a plebiscite was held so as to decide which whether Sylhet region covering entire Sylhet, Moulovi Bazaar, Karimganj would remain in India or join the newly formed Pakistan. Abdul Matlib Mazumdar was one of the silent Indian freedom fighters who led a delegation before Radcliffe commission to ensure Greater Sylhet region remained with India/Assam. But on stern demands of the Muslim League, and with support of top leaders of Assam then, plebiscite was held where Sylhet region (including Karimganj) voted to go with Pakistan, winning by a very small margin. The referendum was held in July 1947, and the ayes for Pakistan won by a razor-thin margin. There were allegations of rigging and bogus votes, but that was only to be expected, whichever side won. Sylhet was gifted to East Pakistan with Karimganj being divided and handed over to India/Assam reason stated to let India have proper connectivity with Tripura. The Kushiyara River was made the river border between India & East Pakistan (now Bangladesh). Parts of Greater Karimganj including Beani-Bazar, Barlekha, Shahpur and Zakiganj fell under East Pakistan and Karimganj was given to India.

Geography

It is bordered on the north east by Cachar District, east and south by Hailakandi district, south by Mizoram, southwest by Tripura state, and on the west and northwest by Bangladesh. Karimganj, the administrative headquarters and main town of the district also bears the same name, that is, Karimganj. Karimganj town is located on the northern fringe of the district adjoining Bangladesh, by the river Kushiyara.

Its distance from Guwahati - the largest city of Assam - is approximately 330 km by road and about 350 km by rail. Distances of other important places are : Silchar - 55 km, Shillong - 220 km, Agartala - 250 km. Flanked on two sides by the rivers Kushiyara and Longai, Karimganj town is located just on the Bangladesh border with the river Kushiyara flowing in between. One prominent feature of the place is a long and winding canal called Noti Khal meandering through the town. Earlier, it used to be a connecting river way between Kushiyara and Longai facilitating river communication and also balancing of water-levels between the two rivers. Now, however, this canal has been blocked at several places through embankments and landfills to pave way for road transport and construction works. Karimganj and the Barak valley has been prone to serious flooding for decades. The recent floods that did significant damage were in 1976, 1988 and 2007.

The forests of Karimganj were once rich in wildlife but now vanishing due to human onslaught. Rare species found are Tiger, Hoolock gibbon, Porcupine, Golden Langur (Hanuman), Monkey, Fox, Asian Elephant, Giant river otter, macaw parrots, Parakeets, Hornbill, Maina, different types of local and migratory birds, Snakes, Coypubara (2nd largest rodent in world) etc., have been recorded. The Patharia hills reserve forest of the district is the habitat of many mammals and was recommended to upgrade as 'Patharia hills wildlife sanctuary'. The southern part was also recommended as 'Dhaleswari' wildlife sanctuary.

Economy

Karimganj town is an important centre of trade and commerce in the North East India. Its river port, with elaborate infra-structures like cargo-terminal, jetty, warehouses etc., is capable of handling large volumes of cargoes carried by steamers plying through river ways via Bangladesh. Karimganj is also a border trade centre and import-export business worth crores of rupees is carried out through the custom trade point at Dakbangla Ghat in the town and Sutarkandi Custom Station.

Karimganj is an agricultural district. Historically, tea has been the major agricultural product of Cachar region including Karimganj.

Administration

Divisions
Karimganj District has one sub-division. The district has 5 tehsils or development circles (Karimganj, Badarpur, Nilambazar, Patharkandi and Ramkrishna Nagar), two urban areas (Karimganj and Patahrkandi) 4 towns (Karimganj, Badarpur, Ramkrishna Nagar and Patahrkandi), 7 community development blocks (North Karimganj, South Karimganj, Badarpur, Patharkandi, Ramkrishna Nagar, Dullavcherra and Lowairpoa), 7 police stations (Karimganj, Badarpur, Ramkrishna Nagar, Patharkandi, Ratabari, Nilambazar, and Bazarichara), 95 gram panchayats, and seven anchalik panchayats.

There are five Assam Legislative Assembly constituencies in this district: Ratabari, Patharkandi,  Karimganj North,  Karimganj South, and Badarpur. Ratabari is designated for scheduled castes. All five are in the Karimganj Lok Sabha constituency.

Transport

Karimganj town is linked via both rail and road transport with the rest of India. Karimganj town is a railway junction and broad gauge lines connecting Tripura with Assam pass through this station. Badarpur railway station is the biggest junction of the district. The most popular mode of passenger transport, however, is by road. A good number of buses - mostly night services - ply between Karimganj and Guwahati daily. Direct long-distance bus services are also available to Shillong, Agartala, Aizawl and so on. Communication with Silchar, Badarpur, Patharkandi and other nearby places is also mainly dependent on road transport, with services by all sorts of light and heavy vehicles available at frequent intervals. The nearest airport is Kumbhirgram (85 km) near Silchar - the headquarters of the adjacent district of Cachar. Karimganj town is also an important river port and has seasonal cargo and freight transport links with Kolkata through river ways via Bangladesh.

Sutarkandi international border crossing 
Sutarkandi international border crossing on Bangladesh–India border on Karimganj-Beanibazar route is in Karimganj district of Assam in India.

Demographics

Population
According to the 2011 census Karimganj district has a population of 1,228,686, roughly equal to the nation of Bahrain or the US state of New Hampshire. This gives it a ranking of 392nd in India (out of a total of 640). Its population growth rate over the decade 2001-2011 was  20.74%. Karimganj has a sex ratio of 961 females for every 1000 males, and a literacy rate of 79.72%. Scheduled Castes and Scheduled Tribes make up 12.85% and 0.16% of the population respectively.

Religion

Religious demographics are as follows:
 Muslims - 692,489
 Hindus - 521,962
 Christians - 11,990.

According to 2011 Indian Census, the Muslims form a slight majority in the district constituting 56.4% of the population, with Hindus at 42.5% of the population, followed by 1.0% Christians. Small populations of Jain, Buddhists and Sikhs also reside in the district. Way back in 1971 Census, Hindus were slight majority in Karimganj district with forming 55.1% of the population, while Muslims were 44.2% at that time.

Language

According to the 2011 census, 86.84% of the district spoke Bengali, 5.70% Hindi, 2.00% Bishnupriya Manipuri and 1.65% Bhojpuri as their first language.

Karimganj is one of several districts in Assam where Bengali language is spoken by the majority of the population, as also in some other districts such as Cachar, Halaikandi and Hojai. Bengali is the official language in Karimganj along with the other two districts of Barak valley such as Hailakandi and Cachar. Notable minority languages include Bishnupriya Manipuri and Meitei. There are also a small tribal communities like Hrangkhol, Kuki, Khasi, Tripuri and Sakachep.

Notable people 

 Siddique Ahmed, MLA of Karimganj South
 Syed Mujtaba Ali, author, journalist, travel enthusiast, academic, scholar and linguist
 Syed Murtaza Ali, author, and historian
 Radheshyam Biswas, former MP for Karimganj
 Abdul Munim Choudhury, former MLA of Karimganj South
 Achyut Charan Choudhury, historian
 Khaled Choudhury, theatre personality
 Najib Ali Choudhury, Islamic scholar and founder of Assam's first madrasa (Madinatul Uloom Bagbari)
 Dwarka Nath Das, former MP for Karimganj
 Mission Ranjan Das, former MLA of Karimganj North (1991–1996) & (1999–2006)
 Nepal Chandra Das, former MP for Karimganj
 Gurusaday Dutt, folklorist
 Ketaki Prasad Dutta, former president of the District Sports Association, Karimganj
 Shukhendu Shekhar Dutta, former MLA of Patharkandi
 Zohurul Hoque, translator of the Qur'an into Bengali, Assamese and English
 Adam Khaki, 14th-century Sufi missionary
 Aziz Ahmed Khan, former MLA of Karimganj South
 Bijoy Malakar, MLA of Ratabari
 Kripanath Mallah, MP of Karimganj, former Deputy Speaker in the Assam Legislative Assembly
 Sambhu Sing Mallah, former MLA of Ratabari 
 Krishnendu Paul, MLA of Patharkandi
 Kamalakhya Dey Purkayastha, MLA of Karimganj North
 Ramapayare Rabidas, former MLA of Ratabari
 Kartik Sena Sinha, former MLA of Patharkandi
 Lalit Mohan Suklabaidya, former MP for Karimganj
 Madhusudhan Tiwari, former MLA of Patharkandi (1991–1996)
 Abu Saleh Najmuddin, former MLA of Badarpur (1991–1996), (1996–2001), and former Minister of Assam.
 Jamal Uddin Ahmed (MLA)

Notes

References

External links

 Karimganj District official website
 KarimganjTown
 Karimganj District KARIMGANJ ONLINE
 About Karimganj
 Karimganj District

 
Districts of Assam
1983 establishments in Assam
Minority Concentrated Districts in India